Stormont County  area  is a county in the Canadian province of Ontario.

Stormont was created in 1792, but was settled seven years earlier in 1785. Veterans of Loyalist regiments were among the first settlers. An estimated one third of the pioneers in the county were Highlander, one third German and the rest English, Irish and Lowland Scots people.

The original territory of Stormont also included Russell County, which became a separate county in 1800.

Stormont later united with Dundas and Glengarry to form the regional government United Counties of Stormont, Dundas and Glengarry.

Historic Townships
Cornwall (SE): area . Was settled in 1785 by veterans of Sir John Johnson's and other Loyalist companies. Community centres were Moulinette, north Field and Cornwall. This township is now part of South Stormont Township
Finch (NW): Was part of Osnabruck Township until 1798. It was settled in 1785. It is named in honour of Lady Elizabeth Finch, wife of the first Earl of Mansfield. Community centres were Crysler, Berwick, Finch, and Glen Payne. The township is now part of North Stormont Township
Osnabruck (SW): area . Surveyed from 1784 to 1787, it was named from a Hanoverian town closely associated with the royal family. The township was settled in 1785 by Loyalist veterans, many of them Germans. Community Centres: Newington, Grantley, Osnabruck Centre and Wales. The township is now part of South Stormont Township.
Roxborough (NE): Was part of Cornwall Township until 1798. It was named from the Scottish County. Community Centres were Moose Creek, Avonmore and Monckland. The township is now part of North Stormont Township.

Sources
Province of Ontario -- A History 1615 to 1927 by Jesse Edgar Middleton and Fred Landon, copyright 1927, Dominion Publishing Company, Toronto

See also
 List of Ontario census divisions
 The Lost Villages
List of townships in Ontario

External links
1951 map of Stormont County

Former counties in Ontario